Lup or LUP may refer to:
 Landkreis Ludwigslust-Parchim, a district in the west of Mecklenburg-Vorpommern, Germany 
 Lead units of pressure, a measurement for the estimation of chamber pressures in firearms
 Leiden University Press, a publishing house and part of Leiden University
 Liberty Union Party, a political party of Vermont, USA
 Lifeless undead phenomenon, a term originating in the Richard Matheson story
 Lift Upgrading Programme, a Singapore Housing and Development Board (HDB) project
 Kalaupapa Airport, Hawaii (IATA Code: LUP)
 LUP decomposition, a matrix decomposition useful in solving an n-by-n systems of linear equations
 Lupus (constellation)
 "Dance of the Dead"